The 1987 WEC in Japan (1000 km of Fuji) was the tenth and final round of the 1987 World Sports-Prototype Championship as well as the fifth round of the 1987 All Japan Sports Prototype Car Endurance Championship. It took place at Fuji Speedway, Japan on September 27, 1987.

Official results
Class winners in bold.  Cars failing to complete 75% of the winner's distance marked as Not Classified (NC).

Statistics
 Pole Position - #28 Person's Racing Team - 1:19.021
 Fastest Lap - #36 Toyota Team Tom's - 1:23.096
 Average Speed - 176.216 km/h

References

 
 

Fuji
Fuji
6 Hours of Fuji